The 2009 Pacific Cup, known as the 2009 SP Brewery Pacific Cup due to sponsorship, was a rugby league competition held in Port Moresby, Papua New Guinea.

Tonga, Fiji and PNG had their places in the draw confirmed initially, with the Cook Islands defeating Samoa in a Pacific Cup qualifier in Cairns on 17 October 2009 to decide which team took the final place in the tournament.

The four Pacific Cup matches were played at Lloyd Robson Oval on 24–25 October and 31 October. The Pacific Cup final was played on 1 November 2009 between Papua New Guinea and the Cook Islands. By winning the 2009 Pacific Cup, Papua New Guinea won the right to compete in the 2010 Four Nations tournament.

Brian Canavan was appointed as tournament director by the Rugby League International Federation (RLIF).

Matches

Qualifying

Semifinals

Third place Playoff

Final

Telecast Details
The Pacific Cup was shown in the UK, Australia, and throughout the Pacific.
In Australia all matches were broadcast by NRL.com while the Nine Network showed a one-hour highlight package each weekend.
In Britain matches were broadcast on BSkyB.
FM100 radio broadcast to Papua New Guinea and the Pacific.
In Papua New Guinea EM TV broadcast terrestrially to more than half of the population.
Fiji TV broadcast the games in Fiji on its free to air service Fiji One and on its Sky Pacific platform to the rest of the Pacific Region.

Squads

Mate Ma'a Tonga
Tonga played a Pacific Cup warm up match against New Zealand. New Zealand defeated Tonga 40–24 in what was a strong performance by the Tongans as they prepared for their Pacific Cup opener against Papua New Guinea.
Coach: Rohan Smith

Cook Islands
Coach: David Fairleigh (Parramatta Eels)

Alex Glenn was originally named but withdrew after a groin injury required surgery.

Toa Samoa
Coach: Willie Poching (Leeds Rhinos)

Papua New Guinea Kumuls
Coach: Adrian Lam (Sydney Roosters)

Fiji Bati
Coach: Terry Gilogely

References

Pacific Cup
Pacific Cup
International rugby league competitions hosted by Papua New Guinea
Pacific Cup
2009 in Tongan sport
2009 in Samoan sport
2009 in Cook Islands sport
2009 in Fijian sport